Thomas Weelkes (baptised 25 October 1576 – 30 November 1623) was an English composer and organist.  He became organist of Winchester College in 1598, moving to Chichester Cathedral.  His works are chiefly vocal, and include madrigals, anthems and services.

Life

Weelkes was baptised in the little village church of Elsted near Chichester in West Sussex on 25 October 1576. It has been suggested that his father was John Weeke, rector of Elsted, although there is no documentary evidence of the relationship. In 1597 his first volume of madrigals was published, the preface noting that he was a very young man when they were written; this helps to fix the date of his birth to somewhere in the middle of the 1570s. He dedicated the volume to George Philpot. Early in his life he was in service at the house of the courtier Edward Darcy. At the end of 1598, probably aged 22, Weelkes was appointed organist at Winchester College, where he remained for two or three years, receiving the quarterly salary of 13s 4d (£2 for three-quarters). His remuneration included board and lodging.

During his Winchester period, Weelkes composed a further two volumes of madrigals (1598, 1600). He obtained his B. Mus. He was also given a lay clerkship at the Cathedral, being paid £15 2s 4d annually alongside his board, lodging and other amenities. The following year he married Elizabeth Sandham, from a wealthy local family. They had three children and it was rumoured that Elizabeth was already pregnant at the time of the marriage.

Weelkes' fourth and final volume of madrigals, published in 1608, carries a title page where he refers to himself as a Gentleman of the Chapel Royal; however, records at the Chapel Royal itself do not mention him, so at most he could only have been a Gentleman Extraordinary - one of those who were asked to stand in until a permanent replacement was found.

While Weelkes was there the Choir of Chichester Cathedral was often in trouble with the authorities for poor behaviour. Weelkes appears to have become an alcoholic. As the Oxford Dictionary of National Biography puts it, 
In 1609 he was charged with unauthorised absence from Chichester, but no mention of drunken behaviour is made until 1613, and J Shepherd, a Weelkes scholar, has suggested caution in assuming that his decline began before this date.

In 1616 he was reported to the Bishop for being "noted and famed for a comon  and notorious swearer & blasphemer". The Dean and Chapter dismissed him for being drunk at the organ and using bad language during divine service. He was however reinstated and remained in the post until his death, although his behaviour did not improve; in 1619 Weelkes was again reported to the Bishop:

In 1622 Elizabeth Weelkes died. Thomas Weelkes was, by this time, reinstated at Chichester Cathedral, but appeared to be spending a great deal of time in London. He died in London in 1623, in the house of a friend, almost certainly on 30 November and was buried on 1 December 1623 at St Bride's Fleet Street. Weelkes's will, made the day before he died at the house of his friend Henry Drinkwater of St Bride's parish, left his estate to be shared between his three children, with a large 50s legacy left to Drinkwater for his meat, drink and lodging.
Weelkes has a memorial stone in Chichester Cathedral.

Music
Thomas Weelkes is best known for his vocal music, especially his madrigals and church music. Weelkes wrote more Anglican services than any other major composer of the time, mostly for evensong. Many of his anthems are verse anthems, which would have suited the small forces available at Chichester Cathedral.  It has been suggested that larger-scale pieces were intended for the Chapel Royal. A number of Weelkes's church anthems were included in The Oxford Book of Tudor Anthems in 1978.

Only a small amount of instrumental music was written by Weelkes, and it is rarely performed. His consort music is sombre in tone, contrasting with the often gleeful madrigals.

Madrigals

Weelkes's madrigals are often compared to those of John Wilbye (who the Dictionary of National Biography described as the most famous of the English madrigalists): it has been suggested that the personalities of the two men - Wilbye appears to have been a more sober character than Weelkes - are reflected in the music. Both men were interested in word painting. Weelkes' madrigals are very chromatic and use varied organic counterpoint and unconventional rhythm in their construction.

Weelkes was friends with the madrigalist Thomas Morley who died in 1602, when Weelkes was in his mid-twenties (Weelkes commemorated his death in a madrigal-form anthem titled A Remembrance of my Friend Thomas Morley, also known as "Death hath Deprived Me").

Some of Weelkes's madrigals were reprinted in popular collections during the eighteenth and nineteenth centuries.

References

Notes

Citations

Sources

Further reading

 
 Philip Ledger (ed) The Oxford Book of English Madrigals OUP 1978

External links 

Thomas Weelkes biography on Here of a Sunday Morning website.
Thomas Weelkes biography on Singers.com website

English classical composers
English madrigal composers
English classical organists
British male organists
Cathedral organists
Renaissance composers
English Baroque composers
16th-century English composers
17th-century English composers
1576 births
1623 deaths
17th-century classical composers
English male classical composers
Classical composers of church music
17th-century male musicians
Male classical organists